The mammalian target of rapamycin (mTOR), also referred to as the mechanistic target of rapamycin, and sometimes called FK506-binding protein 12-rapamycin-associated protein 1  (FRAP1), is a kinase that in humans is encoded by the MTOR gene. mTOR is a member of the phosphatidylinositol 3-kinase-related kinase family of protein kinases.

mTOR links with other proteins and serves as a core component of two distinct protein complexes, mTOR complex 1 and mTOR complex 2, which regulate different cellular processes. In particular, as a core component of both complexes, mTOR functions as a serine/threonine protein kinase that regulates cell growth, cell proliferation, cell motility, cell survival, protein synthesis, autophagy, and transcription. As a core component of mTORC2, mTOR also functions as a tyrosine protein kinase that promotes the activation of insulin receptors and insulin-like growth factor 1 receptors. mTORC2 has also been implicated in the control and maintenance of the actin cytoskeleton.

Discovery

Rapa Nui (Easter Island - Chile)

The study of TOR originated in the 1960s with an expedition to Easter Island (known by the island inhabitants as Rapa Nui), with the goal of identifying natural products from plants and soil with possible therapeutic potential. In 1972, Suren Sehgal identified a small molecule, from a soil bacterium Streptomyces hygroscopicus, that he purified and initially reported to possess potent antifungal activity. He appropriately named it rapamycin, noting its original source and activity (Sehgal et al., 1975). However, early testing revealed that rapamycin also had potent immunosuppressive and cytostatic anti-cancer activity. Rapamycin did not initially receive significant interest from the pharmaceutical industry until the 1980s, when Wyeth-Ayerst supported Sehgal's efforts to further investigate rapamycin's effect on the immune system. This eventually led to its FDA approval as an immunosuppressant following kidney transplantation. However, prior to its FDA approval, how rapamycin worked remained completely unknown.

Subsequent history

The discovery of TOR and mTOR stemmed from independent studies of the natural product rapamycin by Joseph Heitman, Rao Movva, and Michael N. Hall in 1991; by David M. Sabatini, Hediye Erdjument-Bromage, Mary Lui, Paul Tempst, and Solomon H. Snyder in 1994; and by Candace J. Sabers, Mary M. Martin, Gregory J. Brunn, Josie M. Williams, Francis J. Dumont, Gregory Wiederrecht, and Robert T. Abraham in 1995. In 1991, working in yeast, Hall and colleagues identified the TOR1 and TOR2 genes. In 1993, Robert Cafferkey, George Livi, and colleagues, and Jeannette Kunz, Michael N. Hall, and colleagues independently cloned genes that mediate the toxicity of rapamycin in fungi, known as the TOR/DRR genes. However, the molecular target of the FKBP12-rapamycin complex in mammals was not known. In 1994, researchers working in the labs of Stuart L. Schreiber, Solomon H. Snyder and Robert T. Abraham independently discovered a protein that directly interacts with FKBP12-rapamycin, which became known as mTOR due to its homology to the yeast TOR/DRR genes.

Rapamycin arrests fungal activity at the G1 phase of the cell cycle. In mammals, it suppresses the immune system by blocking the G1 to S phase transition in T-lymphocytes.  Thus, it is used as an immunosuppressant following organ transplantation.  Interest in rapamycin was renewed following the discovery of the structurally related immunosuppressive natural product FK506 in 1987. In 1989–90, FK506 and rapamycin were determined to inhibit T-cell receptor (TCR) and IL-2 receptor signaling pathways, respectively.  The two natural products were used to discover the FK506- and rapamycin-binding proteins, including FKBP12, and to provide evidence that FKBP12–FK506 and FKBP12–rapamycin might act through gain-of-function mechanisms that target distinct cellular functions. These investigations included key studies by Francis Dumont and Nolan Sigal at Merck contributing to show that FK506 and rapamycin behave as reciprocal antagonists.  These studies implicated FKBP12 as a possible target of rapamycin, but suggested that the complex might interact with another element of the mechanistic cascade.

In 1991, calcineurin was identified as the target of FKBP12-FK506.  That of FKBP12-rapamycin remained mysterious until genetic and molecular studies in yeast established FKBP12 as the target of rapamycin, and implicated TOR1 and TOR2 as the targets of FKBP12-rapamycin in 1991 and 1993, followed by studies in 1994 when several groups, working independently, discovered the mTOR kinase as its direct target in mammalian tissues.   Sequence analysis of mTOR revealed it to be the direct ortholog of proteins encoded by the yeast target of rapamycin 1 and 2 (TOR1 and TOR2) genes, which Joseph Heitman, Rao Movva, and Michael N. Hall had identified in August 1991 and May 1993. Independently, George Livi and colleagues later reported the same genes, which they called dominant rapamycin resistance 1 and 2 (DRR1 and DRR2), in studies published in October 1993.

The protein, now called mTOR, was originally named FRAP by Stuart L. Schreiber and RAFT1 by David M. Sabatini; FRAP1 was used as its official gene symbol in humans. Because of these different names, mTOR, which had been first used by Robert T. Abraham,  was increasingly adopted by the community of scientists working on the mTOR pathway to refer to the protein and in homage to the original discovery of the TOR protein in yeast that was named TOR, the Target of Rapamycin, by Joe Heitman, Rao Movva, and Mike Hall. TOR was originally discovered at the Biozentrum and Sandoz Pharmaceuticals in 1991 in Basel, Switzerland, and the name TOR pays further homage to this discovery, as TOR means doorway or gate in German, and the city of Basel was once ringed by a wall punctuated with gates into the city, including the iconic Spalentor. "mTOR" initially meant "mammalian target of rapamycin," but the meaning of the "m" was later changed to "mechanistic".  Similarly, with subsequent discoveries the zebra fish TOR was named zTOR, the Arabidopsis thaliana TOR was named AtTOR, and the Drosophila TOR was named dTOR. In 2009 the FRAP1 gene name was officially changed by the HUGO Gene Nomenclature Committee (HGNC) to mTOR, which stands for mechanistic target of rapamycin.

The discovery of TOR and the subsequent identification of mTOR opened the door to the molecular and physiological study of what is now called the mTOR pathway and had a catalytic effect on the growth of the field of chemical biology, where small molecules are used as probes of biology.

Function 
mTOR integrates the input from upstream pathways, including insulin, growth factors (such as IGF-1 and IGF-2), and amino acids. mTOR also senses cellular nutrient, oxygen, and energy levels. The mTOR pathway is a central regulator of mammalian metabolism and physiology, with important roles in the function of tissues including liver, muscle, white and brown adipose tissue, and the brain, and is dysregulated in human diseases, such as diabetes, obesity, depression, and certain cancers. Rapamycin inhibits mTOR by associating with its intracellular receptor FKBP12. The FKBP12–rapamycin complex binds directly to the FKBP12-Rapamycin Binding (FRB) domain of mTOR, inhibiting its activity.

mTOR in plants 
Plants express the mechanistic target of rapamycin (mTOR) and have a TOR kinase complex. In plants, only the TORC1 complex is present unlike that of mammalian target of rapamycin which also contains the TORC2 complex. Plant species have TOR proteins in the protein kinase and FKBP-rapamycin binding (FRB) domains that share a similar amino acid sequence to mTOR in mammals.

Role of mTOR in plants

The TOR kinase complex has been known for having a role in the metabolism of plants. The TORC1 complex turns on when plants are living the proper environmental conditions to survive. Once activated, plant cells undergo particular anabolic reactions. These include plant development, translation of mRNA and the growth of cells within the plant. However, the TORC1 complex activation stops catabolic processes such as autophagy from occurring. TOR kinase signaling in plants has been found to aid in senescence, flowering, root and leaf growth, embryogenesis, and the meristem activation above the root cap of a plant.  mTOR is also found to be highly involved in developing embryo tissue in plants.

Complexes

mTOR is the catalytic subunit of two structurally distinct complexes: mTORC1 and mTORC2. The two complexes localize to different subcellular compartments, thus affecting their activation and function. Upon activation by Rheb, mTORC1 localizes to the Ragulator-Rag complex on the lysosome surface where it then becomes active in the presence of sufficient amino acids.

mTORC1

mTOR Complex 1 (mTORC1) is composed of mTOR, regulatory-associated protein of mTOR (Raptor), mammalian lethal with SEC13 protein 8  (mLST8) and the non-core components PRAS40 and DEPTOR.  This complex functions as a nutrient/energy/redox sensor and controls protein synthesis. The activity of mTORC1 is regulated by rapamycin, insulin, growth factors, phosphatidic acid, certain amino acids and their derivatives (e.g., -leucine and β-hydroxy β-methylbutyric acid), mechanical stimuli, and oxidative stress.

mTORC2

mTOR Complex 2 (mTORC2) is composed of MTOR, rapamycin-insensitive companion of MTOR (RICTOR), MLST8, and mammalian stress-activated protein kinase interacting protein 1 (mSIN1).  mTORC2 has been shown to function as an important regulator of the actin cytoskeleton through its stimulation of F-actin stress fibers, paxillin, RhoA, Rac1, Cdc42, and protein kinase C α (PKCα).  mTORC2 also phosphorylates the serine/threonine protein kinase Akt/PKB on serine residue Ser473, thus affecting metabolism and survival. Phosphorylation of Akt's serine residue Ser473 by mTORC2 stimulates Akt phosphorylation on threonine residue Thr308 by PDK1 and leads to full Akt activation. In addition, mTORC2 exhibits tyrosine protein kinase activity and phosphorylates the insulin-like growth factor 1 receptor (IGF-1R) and insulin receptor (InsR) on the tyrosine residues Tyr1131/1136 and Tyr1146/1151, respectively, leading to full activation of IGF-IR and InsR.

Inhibition by rapamycin 
Rapamycin inhibits mTORC1, and this appears to provide most of the beneficial effects of the drug (including life-span extension in animal studies). Rapamycin has a more complex effect on mTORC2, inhibiting it only in certain cell types under prolonged exposure. Disruption of mTORC2 produces the diabetic-like symptoms of decreased glucose tolerance and insensitivity to insulin.

Gene deletion experiments 
The mTORC2 signaling pathway is less defined than the mTORC1 signaling pathway.  The functions of the components of the mTORC complexes have been studied using knockdowns and knockouts and were found to produce the following phenotypes:
 NIP7: Knockdown reduced mTORC2 activity that is indicated by decreased phosphorylation of mTORC2 substrates.
 RICTOR: Overexpression leads to metastasis and knockdown inhibits growth factor-induced PKC-phosphorylation. Constitutive deletion of Rictor in mice leads to embryonic lethality, while tissue specific deletion leads to a variety of phenotypes; a common phenotype of Rictor deletion in liver, white adipose tissue, and pancreatic beta cells is systemic glucose intolerance and insulin resistance in one or more tissues. Decreased Rictor expression in mice decreases male, but not female, lifespan.
 mTOR: Inhibition of mTORC1 and mTORC2 by PP242 [2-(4-Amino-1-isopropyl-1H-pyrazolo[3,4-d]pyrimidin-3-yl)-1H-indol-5-ol] leads to autophagy or apoptosis; inhibition of mTORC2 alone by PP242 prevents phosphorylation of Ser-473 site on AKT and arrests the cells in G1 phase of the cell cycle. Genetic reduction of mTOR expression in mice significantly increases lifespan.
 PDK1: Knockout is lethal; hypomorphic allele results in smaller organ volume and organism size but normal AKT activation.
 AKT: Knockout mice experience spontaneous apoptosis (AKT1), severe diabetes (AKT2), small brains (AKT3), and growth deficiency (AKT1/AKT2). Mice heterozygous for AKT1 have increased lifespan. 
TOR1, the S. cerevisiae orthologue of mTORC1, is a regulator of both carbon and nitrogen metabolism; TOR1 KO strains regulate response to nitrogen as well as carbon availability, indicating that it is a key nutritional transducer in yeast.

Clinical significance

Aging 

Decreased TOR activity has been found to increase life span in S. cerevisiae, C. elegans, and D. melanogaster. The mTOR inhibitor rapamycin has been confirmed to increase lifespan in mice.

It is hypothesized that some dietary regimes, like caloric restriction and methionine restriction, cause lifespan extension by decreasing mTOR activity. Some studies have suggested that mTOR signaling may increase during aging, at least in specific tissues like adipose tissue, and rapamycin may act in part by blocking this increase. An alternative theory is mTOR signaling is an example of antagonistic pleiotropy, and while high mTOR signaling is good during early life, it is maintained at an inappropriately high level in old age. Calorie restriction and methionine restriction may act in part by limiting levels of essential amino acids including leucine and methionine, which are potent activators of mTOR.  The administration of leucine into the rat brain has been shown to decrease food intake and body weight via activation of the mTOR pathway in the hypothalamus.

According to the free radical theory of aging, reactive oxygen species cause damage to mitochondrial proteins and decrease ATP production. Subsequently, via ATP sensitive AMPK, the mTOR pathway is inhibited and ATP-consuming protein synthesis is downregulated, since mTORC1 initiates a phosphorylation cascade activating the ribosome. Hence, the proportion of damaged proteins is enhanced. Moreover, disruption of mTORC1 directly inhibits mitochondrial respiration. These positive feedbacks on the aging process are counteracted by protective mechanisms: Decreased mTOR activity (among other factors) upregulates removal of dysfunctional cellular components via autophagy.

mTOR is a key initiator of the senescence-associated secretory phenotype (SASP).  Interleukin 1 alpha (IL1A) is found on the surface of senescent cells where it contributes to the production of SASP factors due to a positive feedback loop with NF-κB. Translation of mRNA for IL1A is highly dependent upon mTOR activity. mTOR activity increases levels of IL1A, mediated by MAPKAPK2.  mTOR inhibition of ZFP36L1 prevents this protein from degrading transcripts of numerous components of SASP factors.

Cancer 
Over-activation of mTOR signaling significantly contributes to the initiation and development of tumors and mTOR activity was found to be deregulated in many types of cancer including breast, prostate, lung, melanoma, bladder, brain, and renal carcinomas. Reasons for constitutive activation are several. Among the most common are mutations in tumor suppressor PTEN gene. PTEN phosphatase negatively affects mTOR signalling through interfering with the effect of PI3K, an upstream effector of mTOR. Additionally, mTOR activity is deregulated in many cancers as a result of increased activity of PI3K or Akt. Similarly, overexpression of downstream mTOR effectors 4E-BP1, S6K1, S6K2  and eIF4E leads to poor cancer prognosis. Also, mutations in TSC proteins that inhibit the activity of mTOR may lead to a condition named tuberous sclerosis complex, which exhibits as benign lesions and increases the risk of renal cell carcinoma.

Increasing mTOR activity was shown to drive cell cycle progression and increase cell proliferation mainly due to its effect on protein synthesis. Moreover, active mTOR supports tumor growth also indirectly by inhibiting autophagy. Constitutively activated mTOR functions in supplying carcinoma cells with oxygen and nutrients by increasing the translation of HIF1A and supporting angiogenesis. mTOR also aids in another metabolic adaptation of cancerous cells to support their increased growth rate—activation of glycolytic metabolism. Akt2, a substrate of mTOR, specifically of mTORC2, upregulates expression of the glycolytic enzyme PKM2 thus contributing to the Warburg effect.

Central nervous system disorders / Brain function

Autism 
mTOR is implicated in the failure of a 'pruning' mechanism of the excitatory synapses in autism spectrum disorders.

Alzheimer's disease 
mTOR signaling intersects with Alzheimer's disease (AD) pathology in several aspects, suggesting its potential role as a contributor to disease progression.  In general, findings demonstrate mTOR signaling hyperactivity in AD brains.  For example, postmortem studies of human AD brain reveal dysregulation in PTEN, Akt, S6K, and mTOR.  mTOR signaling appears to be closely related to the presence of soluble amyloid beta (Aβ) and tau proteins, which aggregate and form two hallmarks of the disease, Aβ plaques and neurofibrillary tangles, respectively.  In vitro studies have shown Aβ to be an activator of the PI3K/AKT pathway, which in turn activates mTOR.  In addition, applying Aβ to N2K cells increases the expression of p70S6K, a downstream target of mTOR known to have higher expression in neurons that eventually develop neurofibrillary tangles.  Chinese hamster ovary cells transfected with the 7PA2 familial AD mutation also exhibit increased mTOR activity compared to controls, and the hyperactivity is blocked using a gamma-secretase inhibitor.  These in vitro studies suggest that increasing Aβ concentrations increases mTOR signaling; however, significantly large, cytotoxic Aβ concentrations are thought to decrease mTOR signaling.

Consistent with data observed in vitro, mTOR activity and activated p70S6K have been shown to be significantly increased in the cortex and hippocampus of animal models of AD compared to controls.  Pharmacologic or genetic removal of the Aβ in animal models of AD eliminates the disruption in normal mTOR activity, pointing to the direct involvement of Aβ in mTOR signaling.  In addition, by injecting Aβ oligomers into the hippocampi of normal mice, mTOR hyperactivity is observed.  Cognitive impairments characteristic of AD appear to be mediated by the phosphorylation of PRAS-40, which detaches from and allows for the mTOR hyperactivity when it is phosphorylated; inhibiting PRAS-40 phosphorylation prevents Aβ-induced mTOR hyperactivity.  Given these findings, the mTOR signaling pathway appears to be one mechanism of Aβ-induced toxicity in AD.

The hyperphosphorylation of tau proteins into neurofibrillary tangles is one hallmark of AD.  p70S6K activation has been shown to promote tangle formation as well as mTOR hyperactivity through increased phosphorylation and reduced dephosphorylation.  It has also been proposed that mTOR contributes to tau pathology by increasing the translation of tau and other proteins.

Synaptic plasticity is a key contributor to learning and memory, two processes that are severely impaired in AD patients.  Translational control, or the maintenance of protein homeostasis, has been shown to be essential for neural plasticity and is regulated by mTOR.  Both protein over- and under-production via mTOR activity seem to contribute to impaired learning and memory.  Furthermore, given that deficits resulting from mTOR overactivity can be alleviated through treatment with rapamycin, it is possible that mTOR plays an important role in affecting cognitive functioning through synaptic plasticity.  Further evidence for mTOR activity in neurodegeneration comes from recent findings demonstrating that eIF2α-P, an upstream target of the mTOR pathway, mediates cell death in prion diseases through sustained translational inhibition. 
 
Some evidence points to mTOR's role in reduced Aβ clearance as well.  mTOR is a negative regulator of autophagy; therefore, hyperactivity in mTOR signaling should reduce Aβ clearance in the AD brain.  Disruptions in autophagy may be a potential source of pathogenesis in protein misfolding diseases, including AD.  Studies using mouse models of Huntington's disease demonstrate that treatment with rapamycin facilitates the clearance of huntingtin aggregates.  Perhaps the same treatment may be useful in clearing Aβ deposits as well.

Lymphoproliferative diseases

Hyperactive mTOR pathways have been identified in certain lymphoproliferative diseases such as autoimmune lymphoproliferative syndrome (ALPS), multicentric Castleman disease, and post-transplant lymphoproliferative disorder (PTLD).

Protein synthesis and cell growth
mTORC1 activation is required for myofibrillar muscle protein synthesis and skeletal muscle hypertrophy in humans in response to both physical exercise and ingestion of certain amino acids or amino acid derivatives. Persistent inactivation of mTORC1 signaling in skeletal muscle facilitates the loss of muscle mass and strength during muscle wasting in old age, cancer cachexia, and muscle atrophy from physical inactivity. mTORC2 activation appears to mediate neurite outgrowth in differentiated mouse neuro2a cells. Intermittent mTOR activation in prefrontal neurons by β-hydroxy β-methylbutyrate inhibits age-related cognitive decline associated with dendritic pruning in animals, which is a phenomenon also observed in humans.

Lysosomal damage inhibits mTOR and induces autophagy 
Active mTORC1 is positioned on lysosomes. mTOR is inhibited when lysosomal membrane is damaged by various exogenous or endogenous agents, such as invading bacteria, membrane-permeant chemicals yielding osmotically active products (this type of injury can be modeled using membrane-permeant dipeptide precursors that polymerize in lysosomes), amyloid protein aggregates (see above section on Alzheimer's disease) and cytoplasmic organic or inorganic inclusions including urate crystals and crystalline silica. The process of mTOR inactivation following lysosomal/endomembrane is mediated by the protein complex termed GALTOR. At the heart of GALTOR is galectin-8, a member of β-galactoside binding superfamily of cytosolic lectins termed galectins, which recognizes lysosomal membrane damage by binding to the exposed glycans on the lumenal side of the delimiting endomembrane.   Following membrane damage, galectin-8, which normally associates with mTOR under homeostatic conditions, no longer interacts with mTOR but now instead binds to SLC38A9, RRAGA/RRAGB, and LAMTOR1,  inhibiting Ragulator's (LAMTOR1-5 complex) guanine nucleotide exchange function-

TOR is a negative regulator of autophagy in general, best studied during response to starvation, which is a metabolic response. During lysosomal damage however, mTOR inhibition activates autophagy response in its quality control function, leading to the process termed lysophagy that removes damaged lysosomes. At this stage another galectin, galectin-3, interacts with TRIM16 to guide selective autophagy of damaged lysosomes. TRIM16 gathers ULK1 and principal components (Beclin 1 and ATG16L1) of other complexes (Beclin 1-VPS34-ATG14 and ATG16L1-ATG5-ATG12) initiating autophagy, many of them being under negative control of mTOR directly such as the ULK1-ATG13 complex, or indirectly, such as components of the class III PI3K (Beclin 1, ATG14 and VPS34) since they depend on activating phosphorylations by ULK1 when it is not inhibited by mTOR. These autophagy-driving components physically and functionally link up with each other integrating all processes necessary for autophagosomal formation: (i) the ULK1-ATG13-FIP200/RB1CC1 complex associates with the LC3B/GABARAP conjugation machinery through direct interactions between FIP200/RB1CC1 and ATG16L1, (ii) ULK1-ATG13-FIP200/RB1CC1 complex associates with the Beclin 1-VPS34-ATG14 via direct interactions between ATG13's HORMA domain and ATG14, (iii) ATG16L1 interacts with WIPI2, which binds to PI3P, the enzymatic product of the class III PI3K Beclin 1-VPS34-ATG14. Thus, mTOR inactivation, initiated through GALTOR upon lysosomal damage, plus a simultaneous activation via galectin-9 (which also recognizes lysosomal membrane breach) of AMPK that directly phosphorylates and activates key components (ULK1, Beclin 1) of the autophagy systems listed above and further inactivates mTORC1, allows for strong autophagy induction and autophagic removal of damaged lysosomes.

Additionally, several types of ubiquitination events parallel and complement the galectin-driven processes: Ubiquitination of TRIM16-ULK1-Beclin-1 stabilizes these complexes to promote autophagy activation as described above. ATG16L1  has an intrinsic binding affinity for ubiquitin); whereas ubiquitination by a glycoprotein-specific FBXO27-endowed ubiquitin ligase of several damage-exposed glycosylated lysosomal membrane proteins such as LAMP1, LAMP2, GNS/N-acetylglucosamine-6-sulfatase, TSPAN6/tetraspanin-6, PSAP/prosaposin, and TMEM192/transmembrane protein 192 may contribute to the execution of lysophagy via autophagic receptors such as p62/SQSTM1, which is recruited during lysophagy, or other to be determined functions.

Scleroderma
Scleroderma, also known as systemic sclerosis, is a chronic systemic autoimmune disease characterised by hardening (sclero) of the skin (derma) that affects internal organs in its more severe forms. mTOR plays a role in fibrotic diseases and autoimmunity, and blockade of the mTORC pathway is under investigation as a treatment for scleroderma.

mTOR inhibitors as therapies

Transplantation
mTOR inhibitors, e.g. rapamycin, are already used to prevent transplant rejection.

Glycogen storage disease
Some articles reported that rapamycin can inhibit mTORC1 so that the phosphorylation of GS (glycogen synthase) can be increased in skeletal muscle. This discovery represents a potential novel therapeutic approach for glycogen storage disease that involve glycogen accumulation in muscle.

Anti-cancer
There are two primary mTOR inhibitors used in the treatment of human cancers, temsirolimus and everolimus. mTOR inhibitors have found use in the treatment of a variety of malignancies, including renal cell carcinoma (temsirolimus) and pancreatic cancer, breast cancer, and renal cell carcinoma (everolimus). The complete mechanism of these agents is not clear, but they are thought to function by impairing tumour angiogenesis and causing impairment of the G1/S transition.

Anti-aging
mTOR inhibitors may be useful for treating/preventing several age-associated conditions, including neurodegenerative diseases such as Alzheimer's disease and Parkinson's disease. After a short-term treatment with the mTOR inhibitors dactolisib and everolimus, in elderly (65 and older), treated subjects had a reduced number of infections over the course of a year.

Various natural compounds, including epigallocatechin gallate (EGCG), caffeine, curcumin, berberine, quercetin, resveratrol and pterostilbene, have been reported to inhibit mTOR when applied to isolated cells in culture. As yet no high quality evidence exists that these substances inhibit mTOR signaling or extend lifespan when taken as dietary supplements by humans, despite encouraging results in animals such as fruit flies and mice. Various trials are ongoing.

Interactions 
Mechanistic target of rapamycin has been shown to interact with:

 ABL1,
 AKT1,
 IGF-IR,
 InsR,
 CLIP1,
 EIF3F
 EIF4EBP1,
 FKBP1A,
 GPHN,
 KIAA1303,
 PRKCD,
 RHEB,
 RICTOR,
 RPS6KB1,
 STAT1,
 STAT3,
Two-pore channels: TPCN1; TPCN2, and
 UBQLN1.

References

Further reading

External links 
 
 
 

EC 2.7.11
Signal transduction
Tor signaling pathway
Human proteins
Aging-related proteins